Bowes is an unincorporated community in Plato Township, Kane County, Illinois, United States, located at the intersection of Bowes and Nesler Roads.

References

Unincorporated communities in Illinois
Unincorporated communities in Kane County, Illinois